Upward Bound High School in Hartwick, New York was the first alternative education program in Otsego County, New York. Created by English teacher Mike Newell and principal Mark Rathbun, Upward Bound High school was first located in the basement of a Unitarian church in Oneonta, New York.

Created in the mid-1980s, Upward Bound strived to create an environment for "at-risk" high school students more conducive to learning than traditional publicly run school. By pooling together the students having the most difficulty functioning, regardless of the root of the problem, Upward Bound brought students together by eliminating labels. In classes of a maximum of eight students, each student could now properly be concentrated on.

Though the school has ostensibly disappeared within the last three years , the program still continues, though with less of an eye toward individuality. After the move to Hartwick, Upward Bound students had their own campus and building, providing a safe location in which to thrive.

Always a part of the Otsego-Northern-Catskills BOCES program, Upward Bound most recently joined the local occupational education center in their own wing of the facility. With this transformation, and more closely controlled operations by new BOCES management, much of the founding staff has been displaced.

Though now vastly different from the original concept, the school still represents a progressive approach to alternative education.

External links 
 Otsego Area Occupational Center Alternative Education

Alternative schools in the United States
Defunct schools in New York (state)
Schools in Otsego County, New York